"Tu Amor Eterno" is a song performed by Colombian singer Carlos Vives, released as the second single from his seventh studio album El Amor de Mi Tierra, in 2000. The song was written by Carlos Vives and Martin Madera.

Charts

References

2000 singles
Carlos Vives songs
Spanish-language songs
1999 songs
Songs written by Carlos Vives
EMI Latin singles